Cameron Bay is an Arctic waterway in Qikiqtaaluk Region, Nunavut, Canada. Located off northeastern Cameron Island, the bay is an arm of the Arctic Ocean. Evans Bay is nearby.

References

Bays of Qikiqtaaluk Region